The 1984 Union 76 Pacific Southwest Open was a men's tennis tournament played on outdoor hard courts at the newly-opened Los Angeles Tennis Center in Los Angeles, California in the United States. The event moved back from April to the more traditional September time slot and was part of the 1984 Volvo Grand Prix circuit. It was the 58th edition of the Pacific Southwest tournament and was held from September 10 through September 16, 1984. First-seeded Jimmy Connors won the singles title and the corresponding $36,000 first-prize money.

Finals

Singles
 Jimmy Connors defeated  Eliot Teltscher 6–4, 4–6, 6–4
 It was Connors' 4th singles title of the year and the 104th of his career.

Doubles
 Ken Flach /  Robert Seguso defeated  Wojciech Fibak /  Gene Mayer 4–6, 6–4, 6–3

Prize money

See also
 1984 Virginia Slims of Los Angeles – women's tournament

Notes

References

External links
 ITF tournament edition details

Los Angeles Open (tennis)
Union 76 Pacific Southwest Open
Union 76 Pacific Southwest Open
Union 76 Pacific Southwest Open
Union 76 Pacific Southwest Open